Live in Germany 1983 is a live album. It is a recording of British rock band Atomic Rooster on 1 February 1983, at the Zeche Club in Bochum, Germany.

Former Atomic Rooster guitarist Bernie Tormé released the album, the contents of an old, but still-playable, cassette tape of Jeannie Crane's via his RetroWrek Records label in 2000. The tape was recorded via a single microphone in the audience.

No known live soundboard recording of the 1983 (Crane/Hammond/Tormé) lineup of Atomic Rooster exist. Therefore, despite being of relatively poor audio quality, this album has great significance to fans of the band's later years.

Track listing 
 "Watch Out!" (Crane) 5:06
 "Metal Minds" (music: Vincent Crane; lyrics: Jean Crane) 5:23
 "Tomorrow Night" (Crane) 7:02
 "Carnival" (Crane) 4:45
 "Hold Your Fire" (Crane) 6:10
 "Gershatzer" (Crane) 7:36
 "Devil’s Answer" (Du Cann) 6:47
 "They Took Control of You" (John Du Cann, Crane) 7:32
 "Hold Your Fire" (Crane) 7:38 - encore

Personnel 
Atomic Rooster
 Vincent Crane - Hammond organ, vocals
 Bernie Tormé - guitars
 Paul Hammond - drums, percussion

Atomic Rooster live albums
2000 live albums